Thomas Coffin,  (1817 – July 13, 1890) was a Canadian businessman and politician.

He was born in Barrington, Shelburne County, Nova Scotia in 1817. He owned a general store and with his brother and other partners operated a sawmill and shipbuilding yard on the Clyde River from 1854 until late in the 1870s. In 1855, he was named a justice of the peace and he served as school commissioner in Shelburne County and the Barrington district. He represented Shelburne County in the Nova Scotia House of Assembly as a Reformer from 1851 to 1855 and as a Liberal from 1859 until Confederation. In 1867, he was elected to the 1st Canadian Parliament representing the riding of Shelburne as a Liberal-Conservative supporter of Sir John A. Macdonald. He was re-elected in 1872 and crossed the floor the next year to join the Liberal Party of Canada. He was re-elected 1874 and defeated in 1878. From 1873 to 1878, he was the Receiver General. He died in Barrington in 1890.

References
 
 

1817 births
1890 deaths
Nova Scotia Liberal Party MLAs
Anti-Confederation Party MPs
Liberal Party of Canada MPs
Members of the House of Commons of Canada from Nova Scotia
Members of the King's Privy Council for Canada
Canadian justices of the peace